Otto Lecher (6 January 1860 - 20 January 1939) was an Austrian politician.

He was born in Vienna, Landstraße in Austria. He earned a doctorate of law, and became President of the Board of Trade in Brunn. He was also Secretary of the Brunn Chamber of Trade and Industry. He was elected to the Abgeordnetenhaus ("House of Delegates") of the Reichsrat ("Imperial Council") from Brunn, and served for many years.

He is perhaps best remembered for a 12-hour speech he gave on 28 October 1897: a "filibuster" to block action on the "Ausgleich" with Hungary, which was due for renewal. Mark Twain was present, and described the speech, and the political circumstances which led to it, in his essay "Stirring Times in Austria".

At the end of World War I, Lecher was a  Member of the Provisional Nationalversammlung ("National Assembly") which established the Republic of Austria, serving from 21 October 1918  to 16 February 1919.

Lecher died in Leopoldsdorf im Marchfelde on 20 January 1939.

References

1860 births
1939 deaths
Politicians from Vienna
German-National Party politicians
Members of the Austrian House of Deputies (1897–1900)
Members of the Austrian House of Deputies (1901–1907)
Members of the Austrian House of Deputies (1907–1911)
Members of the Austrian House of Deputies (1911–1918)
Members of the Provisional National Assembly